Koca Sinan Pasha ("Sinan the Great"; c. 1506 - 3 April 1596) was an Albanian-born Ottoman Grand Vizier, military figure, and statesman. From 1580 until his death he served five times as Grand Vizier. In 1594, he ordered the burning of Saint Sava's remains on the Vračar plateau.

Early life
Sinan Pasha, also known as Koca Sinan (Sinan the Great), was born in Topojan in Luma territory and was of Albanian origin. In a Ragusan document of 1571 listing members of the Ottoman Sultan's governing council, Sinan is described as coming from a Catholic family that converted to Islam. His father was named Ali Bey and Sinan Pasha had family ties with Catholic relatives such as the Giubizzas. Austrian orientalist Joseph von Hammer-Purgstall called him the "unbridled Albanian". Mustafa Ali of Gallipoli repeatedly criticized Sinan for promoting an Albanian clique in the administration.

Career
Sinan Pasha was appointed governor of Ottoman Egypt in 1569, and was subsequently involved until 1571 in the conquest of Yemen, becoming known as Fātiḥ-i Yemen ("Conqueror of Yemen").

In 1580, Sinan commanded the army against the Safavids in the Ottoman–Safavid War (1578–1590), and was appointed grand vizier by Sultan Murad III. He was, however, disgraced and exiled in the following year, owing to the defeat of his lieutenant Mehmed Pasha, at Gori (during an attempt to provision the Ottoman garrison of Tbilisi).

He subsequently became governor of Damascus and, in 1589, after the great revolt of the Janissaries, was appointed grand vizier for the second time. He was involved in the competition for the throne in Wallachia between Mihnea Turcitul and Petru Cercel, and ultimately sided with the former (overseeing Petru's execution in March 1590). Another revolt of Janissaries led to his dismissal in 1591, but in 1593 he was again recalled to become grand vizier for the third time, and in the same year he commanded the Ottoman army in the Long War against the Habsburgs, he was faced with massive casualties on the northern front, which was weakened by the death of Bosnian commander Telli Hasan Pasha during the Battle of Sisak. In 1593, he captured Veszprém and Palota after a 3-4 days of siege and turned his attention to the Sisak, where Telli Hasan Pasha and Ahmed Pasha had died. He soon captured Sisak and came back to Belgrade through Novi Sad. 

When Habsburgs invaded Szécsény and Nógrád he demanded help from Istanbul. The agha of Janissaries, Sokolluzade Lala Mehmed Pasha, came to help in a short time. Then he started besieging Györ (Yanuk) and captured the castle. In 1594 during the Uprising in Banat, he ordered for the relics (remains) of Saint Sava to be brought from Mileševa to Belgrade, where he then had them set on fire in order to discourage the Serbs.
In spite of his victories he was again deposed in February 1595, shortly after the accession of Mehmed III, and banished to Malkara. In August, Sinan was in power again, called on to lead the expedition against Prince Michael the Brave of Wallachia. His defeat in the Battle of Călugăreni, the Battle of Giurgiu, and the series of unsuccessful confrontations with the Habsburgs (culminating in the devastating siege and fall of Ottoman-held Esztergom), brought him once more into disfavour, and he was deprived of the seal of office (19 November).

The death of his successor Lala Mehmed Pasha three days later caused Sinan to become grand vizier for the fifth time. He died suddenly in the spring of 1596, leaving behind a large fortune. Sinan Pasha is buried in Istanbul near the Grand Bazaar.

Legacy

Sinan Pasha became grand vizier five times between 1580 and his death in 1596. He had many rivals but he was also a very wealthy man. During his lifetime Sinan Pasha was criticized by Ottoman bureaucrats such as Mustafa Âlî who wrote that Sinan promoted Albanians into the Ottoman government and military. Contemporary Turkish historians also note that he remained close to his heritage and would give those of Albanian stock preference for high-level positions within the empire. In 1586, at his request, Sultan Murad III issued a decree exempting five villages in Luma from all taxes. Sinan Pasha constructed the fortress of Kaçanik in the Kosovo Vilayet with an imaret (soup kitchen), two hans (Inn), a hamam (Turkish bath) and a mosque that still bears his name.

In 1590, he had the Pearl Kiosk built above the seaward walls on the sea of Marmara. It served as Murad III's final residence before his death. One of his final projects in Constantinople was a külliye completed in from 1593 to 1594 by Davut Aga, the chief imperial architect of the time. It is distinguished by the complex masonry and decorations of its türbe and sebil.

He was a major builder of caravanserais, bridges, baths and mosques. These included the town of Kaçanik in Kosovo, important buildings in Sarajevo, Thessalonika and Belgrade, as well as in Istanbul and other countries in the Arab world.

See also
Al-Tujjar Caravansarai (Mount Tabor)
Sinan Pasha Mosque (Damascus)
Sinan Pasha Mosque (Kačanik)
List of Ottoman Grand Viziers
List of Ottoman governors of Egypt

References

Sources

External links

 

1506 births
1596 deaths
16th-century Grand Viziers of the Ottoman Empire
16th-century Ottoman governors of Egypt
Political people from the Ottoman Empire
Pashas
Ottoman governors of Damascus
Albanian Grand Viziers of the Ottoman Empire
Albanians from the Ottoman Empire
Albanian Pashas
Devshirme
Ottoman governors of Egypt
Ottoman people of the Ottoman–Persian Wars
People of the Long Turkish War
People from Kukës